The 2022 BYU Cougars football team represented Brigham Young University in the 2022 NCAA Division I FBS football season. The Cougars were led by seventh-year head coach Kalani Sitake and played their home games at LaVell Edwards Stadium. This was the 12th and final year that BYU competed as an NCAA Division I FBS independent as in 2023, the football program joined the Big 12 Conference.

Before the season

Coaching changes

2022 recruits

2021 returned missionaries

2022 other additions

2022 departures

Schedule
BYU will host six home games, travel to five different away games, and play at a neutral site game in Las Vegas against Notre Dame.

 Game moved to ESPNews at the end of the first quarter, shortly before 7:30 p.m. EDT.

Game summaries

South Florida 

Sources:

Uniform combination: white helmets, white jersey w/ navy stripes, white pants w/ navy accents

No. 9 Baylor 

Sources:

Uniform combination: royal helmets, royal jersey w/ white stripes, royal pants w/ white accents

No. 25 Oregon 

Sources:

Uniform combination: royal helmets, white jersey w/ royal stripes, white pants w/ royal accents

Wyoming 

Sources:

Uniform combination: white helmets, navy jersey w/ white stripes, navy pants w/ white accents

Utah State 

Sources:

Uniform combination: royal helmets, royal jerseys w/ white stripes, white pants w/ royal accents

Notre Dame 

Sources:

Uniform combination: royal helmets featuring Stretch Y w/ black gradient, black jerseys w/ royal stripes, black pants w/ royal accents

Arkansas 

Sources:

Uniform combination: royal helmets w/ dual custom design (Wasatch range/cougar face), white jerseys w/ royal stripes, white pants w/ royal accents

Liberty 

Sources:

Uniform combination: white helmets, white jersey w/ royal stripes, royal pants w/ white accents

East Carolina 

Sources:

Uniform combination: white helmets, royal jerseys w/ white stripes, white pants w/ royal accents

Boise State 

Sources:

Uniform combination: white helmets, white jerseys w/ royal stripes, white pants w/ royal accents

Utah Tech 

Sources:

Uniform combination: white helmets, royal jerseys w/ white stripes, royal pants w/ white accents

Stanford 

Sources:

Uniform combination: royal helmets, white jerseys w/ royal stripes, royal pants w/ white accents

New Mexico Bowl: SMU 

Sources:

Uniform combination: royal helmets featuring Sailor Cougar w/ black gradient, black jerseys w/ royal stripes, black pants w/ royal accents

Rankings

NuSkin BYU Sports Network
The NuSkin BYU Sports Network is owned and operated by BYU Radio and features the talents of Greg Wrubell (play-by-play), Riley Nelson (analyst), Mitchell Juergens (reporter/sideline analyst), and Jason Shepherd (host) for the third consecutive year, with Ben Bagley subbing in for Jason Shepherd when he has women's soccer broadcasts. The network is in charge of producing and broadcasting all BYU Football pre and post game shows as well as coaches shows and live broadcasts.

Affiliates

BYU Radio- Flagship Station Nationwide (Dish Network 980, Sirius XM 143, KBYU 89.1 FM HD 2, TuneIn radio, and byuradio.org)
KSL 102.7 FM and 1160 AM- (Salt Lake City / Provo, Utah and ksl.com)
KSNA- Blackfoot / Idaho Falls / Pocatello / Rexburg, Idaho (games)
KSPZ- Blackfoot / Idaho Falls / Pocatello / Rexburg, Idaho (coaches' shows)
KMXD- Monroe / Manti, Utah
KSVC- Richfield / Manti, Utah
KDXU- St. George, Utah

Personnel

Coaching staff

Roster

Depth Chart

References

BYU
BYU Cougars football seasons
New Mexico Bowl champion seasons
BYU Cougars football